Lloyd Wolfe was a college football and basketball player. Wolfe was a prominent end for the Tennessee Volunteers of the University of Tennessee during the 1914 to 1916. He and Graham Vowell were credited with stopping Rabbit Curry in 1916, a season in which he was selected All-Southern.

References

American football ends
Tennessee Volunteers football players
All-Southern college football players
Tennessee Volunteers basketball players
American men's basketball players